This is a list of women who have made noteworthy contributions to or achievements in statistics.

A
 Helen Abbey (1915–2001), American biostatistician known for prolific mentorship of students
 Edith Abbott (1876–1957), American economist, social worker, educator, and author
 Sarah Abramowitz (born 1967), American statistics educator and textbook author
 Sophie Achard (born 1977), French statistical neuroscientist
 Dorothy Adkins (1912–1975), psychologist concentrating on psychometrics
 Susan Ahmed (born 1946), American biostatistician and educational statistician
 Laura Ahtime, chief executive of the Seychelles National Bureau of Statistics
 Beatrice Aitchison (1908–1997), transportation economist who became the top woman in the United States Postal Service
 Martha Aliaga (1937–2011), Argentine statistics educator and president of the Caucus for Women in Statistics
 Betty Allan (1905–1952), Australian statistician and biometrician, first statistician at CSIRO
 Genevera Allen, American statistician, expert on interpretable learning, reproducibility, and the neuroscience of synesthesia
 I. Elaine Allen, American survey statistician and biostatistician
 Naomi Altman, Canadian–American biostatistician known for her work in kernel methods
 Garnet Anderson, American biostatistician, identified risks of postmenopausal hormone therapy
 Christine Anderson-Cook (born 1966), Canadian expert on design of experiments, reliability, and nuclear forensics
 Mariza de Andrade, Brazilian-American biostatistician known for her work in statistical genetics
 Rebecca Andridge, American expert on imputation of missing data and group-randomized trials
 Svetlana Antonovska (1952-2016), Macedonian sociologist and statistician, founder of contemporary statistics in North Macedonia
 Kellie Archer (born 1969), American biostatistician specializing in microarray analysis techniques
 Margaret Armstrong, Australian geostatistician and textbook author
 Arlene Ash, American statistician who works on risk adjustment in health services
 Jana Asher, American expert in the statistics of human rights and sexual violence
 Deborah Ashby (born 1959), British statistician who specialises in medical statistics and Bayesian statistics

B
 Julie E. Backer (1890–1977), Norwegian health and population statistician in Norway's Central Bureau of Statistics
 Anita K. Bahn (1920–1980), chief epidemiologist of Maryland
 Barbara A. Bailar, American statistician, president and executive director of the American Statistical Association
 Rosemary A. Bailey (born 1947), British statistician who works in the design of experiments and the analysis of variance
 Joan Bailey-Wilson (born 1953), American statistical geneticist
 Rose Baker, British physicist, mathematician, and statistician
 Huldah Bancroft (died 1966), American biostatistician and expert on tropical diseases
 Karen Bandeen-Roche, American biostatistician known for her research on aging
 Rina Foygel Barber, American statistician who studies graphical models, false discovery rates, and regularization
 Mildred Barnard (1908–2000), Australian biometrician, mathematician and statistician
 Jill S. Barnholtz-Sloan, American biostatistician specializing in brain tumors
 Pauline Barrieu, French financial statistician
 Kaye Basford, Australian statistician and biometrician who applies statistical methods to plant genetics
 Carmen Batanero, Spanish statistics educator
 Nancy Bates, senior researcher at the United States Census Bureau
 Mary Batcher, American tax statistician, chair of National Institute of Statistical Sciences
 M. J. Bayarri (1956–2014), Spanish Bayesian statistician, president of International Society for Bayesian Analysis
 Betsy Becker, American researcher on meta-analysis and educational psychometrics
 Laurel Beckett, American biostatistician, expert on Alzheimer's disease and other neurodegenerative diseases
 Grace Bediako, former head of Ghana Statistical Service
 Alexa Beiser, American biostatistician
 Andriëtte Bekker (born 1958), South African mathematical statistician
 Scarlett Bellamy, American biostatistician, expert on interventions in longitudinal behavioural modification trials
 Emma Benn, American biostatistician, performs causal inference on health disparities
 Helen Berg (1932–2010), American feminist economic statistician and mayor of Corvallis, Oregon
 Agnes Berger, Hungarian-American biostatistician
 Lisa Bersales, National Statistician of the Philippines
 Nicky Best, British statistician, expert on Bayesian inference
 Rebecca Betensky, biostatistician at Harvard University and Massachusetts General Hospital
 Julia Bienias, American expert on the biostatistics of Alzheimer's disease
 Ayse Bilgin, Australian statistician and statistics educator, president-elect of International Association for Statistical Education
 Lynne Billard (born 1943), Australian-American AIDS researcher, president of American Statistical Association and International Biometric Society
 Nedret Billor, Turkish statistician, works in robust statistics and outlier detection
 Sheila Bird (born 1952), British biostatistician whose assessment of misuse of statistics led to statistical guidelines for medical journals
 Yvonne Bishop (died 2015), American expert in multivariate analysis who studied anaesthetics and air pollution
 Lenore E. Bixby (died 1994), American statistician who worked with the Social Security Administration and National Academy of Sciences
 Erin Blankenship, American statistics educator
 Carol Joyce Blumberg, American statistician interested in survey methodology, design of experiments, and statistics education
 Eileen Boardman (c. 1942 – 2018), American statistician, applied statistical quality measures to solar power
 Mary Ellen Bock, first female full professor in statistics and first female chair of statistics at Purdue University
 Graciela Boente, Argentine mathematical statistician known for her research in robust statistics
 Jane M. Booker, American statistician, expert in expert elicitation and fuzzy logic
 Connie M. Borror (1966–2016), American statistician and industrial engineer interested in quality control and forensic toxicology
 Bertha C. Boschulte (1906–2004), Virgin Islands educator, women's rights activist, statistician and politician
 Kimiko O. Bowman (1927–2019), Japanese-American statistician, approximated the distribution of maximum likelihood estimators, advocated for people with disabilities
 Veronica Bowman, British military statistician known for her work aggregating COVID-19 predictions
 Barbara Boyes (circa 1932 – 1981), American government survey statistician
 Dorothy Brady (1903–1977), American professor of economics at the Wharton School
 Amy Braverman, American statistician, analyzes remote sensing data and climate models
 Donna Brogan (born 1939), American statistician who works in mental health statistics and analysis of complex survey data
 Jennifer Brown, New Zealand environmental statistician, president of the New Zealand Statistical Association
 Cavell Brownie, Jamaican-American expert on wildlife statistics and capture-recapture methods
 Laurence Broze (born 1960), Belgian applied mathematician, statistician, and economist
 Babette Brumback, American biostatistician, expert on causal inference
 Antonella Buccianti (born 1960), Italian geostatistician, expert on compositional data
 Caitlin E. Buck (born 1964), British archaeologist and statistician known for her work in radiocarbon dating
 Florentina Bunea (born 1966), Romanian statistician interested in machine learning, empirical processes, and high-dimensional statistics
 Lynne Butler (born 1955), American combinatorialist and mathematical statistician
 Margaret K. Butler (1924–2013), statistician at the Bureau of Labor Statistics, developed software for nuclear simulations
 Cristina Butucea, French statistician known for her work on non-parametric statistics, density estimation, and deconvolution
 Christine Bycroft, New Zealand statistician and demographer

C

 Kate Calder, American expert on spatiotemporal Bayesian modeling
 Ann R. Cannon, American statistics educator
 Lynda Carlson (born 1943), American government statistician, director of National Center for Science and Engineering Statistics
 Alexandra Carpentier (born 1987), French mathematical statistician and machine learning researcher
 Alicia L. Carriquiry, Uruguayan statistician, applies Bayesian statistics to nutrition, genomics, forensics, and traffic safety
 Mavis B. Carroll (1917–2009), American statistician who pioneered the industrial use of statistics at General Foods
 Carol S. Carson, American economic statistician, director of Bureau of Economic Analysis, director of statistics for International Monetary Fund
 Ann Cartwright (born 1925), explored issues with the use and perception of primary medical care in Britain
 Ana Casís, Panamanian sociologist, statistician, and demographer
 Mine Çetinkaya-Rundel, Turkish statistics educator known for her open source textbooks
 Kathryn Chaloner (1954–2014), expert in Bayesian experimental design, worked on HIV, AIDS, infectious diseases, and women's health
 Beth Chance (born 1968), American statistics educator
 Anne Chao, Taiwanese environmental statistician known for her work on mark and recapture methods
 Enid Charles (1894–1972), British pioneer in demography and population statistics and expert on fertility rates
 Helen C. Chase, president of Statistics Section of American Public Health Association
 Valérie Chavez-Demoulin, Swiss expert on extreme events and risk management
 Cathy Woan-Shu Chen, Taiwanese statistician interested in Bayesian methods and economic statistics
 Jie Chen, Chinese–American professor of biostatistics and epidemiology and expert on change detection
 Amanda Chetwynd, British combinatorist and spatial statistician
 Francesca Chiaromonte, Italian statistician, expert on statistical genetics and dimensionality reduction
 Marcia Ciol, Brazilian-American expert on comorbidity
 Constance F. Citro (born 1942), American political scientist and statistician, director of the Committee on National Statistics
 Gerda Claeskens, Belgian expert on model selection and model averaging
 Kate Claghorn (1864–1938), American sociologist, economist, statistician, legal scholar, and Progressive Era activist
 Cynthia Clark (born 1942), American government statistician, executive director of Council of Professional Associations on Federal Statistics
 Virginia A. Clark (1928–2018), American biostatistician and statistics textbook author
 Merlise A. Clyde, American statistician known for her work in model averaging for Bayesian statistics
 Clara Collet (1860–1948), British social reformer who collected statistical and descriptive evidence of life for working women and poor people
 Katharine Coman (1857-1915), American historian, economist, sociologist, educator, and social activist, first woman to teach statistics in the US
 Fabienne Comte, French financial statistician, expert on stochastic volatility, autoregressive conditional heteroskedasticity, and deconvolution
 Alanna Connors (1956–2013), Hong Kong-born American astronomer and statistician, introduced Bayesian statistics to high-energy astronomy
 Delores Conway, American statistician, expert on real estate markets
 Dianne Cook, Australian editor of the Journal of Computational and Graphical Statistics
 Cathy A. Cowan, American economist and social scientist
 Gertrude Mary Cox (1900–1978), researcher on experimental design, president of the American Statistical Association
 Stella Cunliffe (1917–2012), British statistician, first female president of the Royal Statistical Society
 Adele Cutler, English-born New Zealand and American statistician who developed archetypal analysis and random forests
 Claudia Czado, German expert on copulas, vines, and their applications in statistical finance
 Veronica Czitrom, Mexican-American statistician, applied statistics to the quality control of semiconductor manufacturing

D
 Dorota Dabrowska, Polish statistician known for her research on counting processes and survival analysis
 Estelle Bee Dagum, Argentine–Canadian–Italian expert in time series and seasonal adjustment
 Angela Dale (born 1945) British statistician known for secondary analysis of government survey data
 Sarah Darby, British epidemiologist and medical statistician
 Nairanjana Dasgupta, Indian statistician, expert on large-scale multiple testing and on the statistics of apple growth
 Susmita Datta, Indian–American biostatistician and Bengali folk musician
 Florence Nightingale David (1909–1993), English statistician, winner of first Elizabeth L. Scott Award
 Marie Davidian, American biostatistician known for her work in longitudinal data analysis and precision medicine
 Beth Dawson, American biostatistician and biostatistics textbook author
 Besse Day (1889–1986), American statistician who pioneered the use of design of experiments in engineering
 Angela Dean, British expert in design of experiments
 Charmaine Dean (born 1958), statistician from Trinidad, president of International Biometric Society and Statistical Society of Canada
 Charlotte Deane (born 1975), statistician and bioinformatics researcher focused on the protein structure of antibodies
 Aurore Delaigle, Australian expert in nonparametric statistics, deconvolution and functional data analysis
 Elizabeth DeLong, American biostatistician interested in outcomes research and comparative effectiveness
 Jill DeMatteis, American statistician specializing in survey methodology
 Rebecca DerSimonian, American biostatistician, introduced random-effects meta-analysis and its application in clinical trials
 Jill Dever, American survey statistician
 Susan J. Devlin, American statistician, expert on robust statistics and local regression
 María del Pilar Díaz, Argentine statistician
 Marie Diener-West, American statistician, ophthalmologist, and expert on clinical trials
 Paula Diehr, American biostatistician and health systems researcher
 E. Jacquelin Dietz, American statistics educator, founding editor of the Journal of Statistics Education
 Cathryn S. Dippo, American government statistician
 Susanne Ditlevsen, Danish mathematical biologist and biostatistician
 Kim-Anh Do, Australian biostatistician of Vietnamese descent at the University of Texas MD Anderson Cancer Center
 Lori E. Dodd, American biostatistician specializing in clinical trial methodology
 Deborah Donnell, New Zealand and American biostatistician, expert on HIV prevention
 Annette Dobson (born 1945), Australian researcher in biostatistics, epidemiology, longitudinal studies, and social determinants of health
 Rebecca Doerge, American researcher in statistical bioinformatics, known for her research on quantitative traits
 Francesca Dominici, Italian statistician who performs collaborative research on projects that combine big data with health policy and climate change
 Christl Donnelly, uses statistics and biomathematics to study epidemiological patterns of infectious diseases
 Miriam Gasko Donoho, American statistician, expert on binary regression, survival analysis, robust regression, and data visualization
 Sandrine Dudoit, applies statistics to microarray and genetic data, co-founder of Bioconductor project
 Vanja Dukic, American biostatistician who uses internet search patterns to track diseases
 Olive Jean Dunn (1915–2008), American statistician, contributed to the development of confidence intervals in biostatistics
 Karen Dunnell (born 1946), Chief Executive of the UK Office for National Statistics and head of the Government Statistical Service
 Debbie Dupuis, Canadian statistician, applies decision science and robust statistics to statistical finance and environmental statistics
 Josée Dupuis, Canadian and American biostatistician, president of International Genetic Epidemiology Society

E
 Lynn Eberly, American researcher in longitudinal studies, medical imaging, and other forms of correlated data
 Constance van Eeden (1927–2021), Dutch nonparameteric statistician who contributed to the development of statistics in Canada
 Nathalie Eisenbaum, French probability theorist
 Janet D. Elashoff, director of biostatistics for Cedars-Sinai Medical Center
 Ethel M. Elderton (1878–1954), British eugenics researcher
 Marie D. Eldridge (1926–2009), director of statistics and analysis at the National Highway Traffic Safety Administration
 Susan S. Ellenberg, American biostatistician, expert in the design of clinical trials and in the safety of medical devices
 Jane Elliott (born 1966), British sociologist who uses longitudinal methods to explore issues of gender and employment
 Lila Elveback (1915–2004), American biostatistician, founder of American College of Epidemiology
 Kathy Ensor, American statistician who discovered correlations between ozone and heart attacks
 Elena Erosheva, Russian social statistician
 Sylvia Esterby, Canadian environmental statistician, founder of the International Environmetrics Society
 Alison Etheridge (born 1964), English researcher in theoretical population genetics and mathematical ecology
 Ruth Etzioni, biostatistician, develops statistical computer models of cancer progression

F
 Yingying Fan, American mathematical statistician and data scientist
 Polly Feigl, American biostatistician, expert on survival distributions and cancer clinical trials
 Eleanor Feingold, American statistical geneticist
 Rachel Fewster, British and New Zealand environmental statistician and statistical ecologist
 Krista Fischer, Estonian biostatistician
 Carol Fitz-Gibbon (1938–2017), British expert and activist in education evaluation
 Evelyn Fix (1904–1965), American statistician who invented the nearest neighbor method
 Betty Flehinger (c. 1922 – 2000), American biostatistician, pioneer of computerized medical diagnosis
 Nancy Flournoy (born 1947), American statistician known for the design of adaptive clinical trials and for the graft-versus-tumor effect in bone marrow transplants
 Sylvia Frühwirth-Schnatter (born 1959), Austrian statistician working in Bayesian inference, president of International Society for Bayesian Analysis
 Rongwei Fu, biostatistician who uses meta-analysis to understand disease patterns
 Montserrat Fuentes, Spanish statistician who applies spatial analysis to atmospheric science
 Cathy Furlong, American statistician active in volunteer work for statistical organizations, president of Statistics Without Borders

G
 Linda Gage, California state demographer
 Nina Gantert, Swiss and German probability theorist
 Nancy L. Garcia, Brazilian spatial statistician
 Martha M. Gardner, American statistician associated with GE Global Research
 Joan Garfield, American educational psychologist specializing in statistics education
 Ursula Gather (born 1953), German robust statistician, rector of TU Dortmund
 Geneviève Gauthier (born 1967), Canadian financial mathematician, statistician, and decision scientist
 Sara van de Geer (born 1958), Dutch statistician, president of the Bernoulli Society
 Hilda Geiringer (1893–1973), Austrian researcher on Fourier series, statistics, probability, and plasticity, refugee from Nazi Germany
 Yulia Gel, American expert in the nonparametric statistics of spatiotemporal data
 Nancy Geller (born 1944), director of biostatistics research at the National Heart, Lung, and Blood Institute
 Maria-Pia Geppert (1907–1997), German mathematician and biostatistician who founded the Biometrical Journal
 Nadia Ghazzali (born 1961), Moroccan-Canadian expert on numbers of clusters and university president
 Jean D. Gibbons (born 1938), American expert in nonparametric statistics and a prolific author of books on statistics
 Irène Gijbels, Belgian mathematical statistician and expert in nonparametric statistics
 Ethel Gilbert, American expert in the risks of radiation-induced cancer
 Krista Gile, American expert on respondent-driven sampling and exponential random graph models
 Dorothy M. Gilford (1919–2014), head of mathematical statistics at the Office of Naval Research and of the National Center for Education Statistics 
 Ingrid Kristine Glad (born 1965), Norwegian statistician, expert in non-parametric regression, microarray data, and image processing
 Beth Gladen, American statistician known for children's environmental health and prevalence estimation
 Amanda L. Golbeck, American biostatistician and academic administrator
 Lisa Goldberg, American mathematical finance scholar and statistician
 Rebecca Goldin, American director of the Statistical Assessment Service
 Christina Goldschmidt, British probability theorist
 Graciela González Farías, Mexican statistician, expert on shape parameters of skewed data
 María Elena González Mederos (1932–1996), Cuban-American government statistician, poetry translator, and human rights activist
 Melody Goodman, American biostatistician interested in social risk factors, health literacy, and stakeholder engagement
 Nancy Gordon, American economist and statistician, president of Caucus for Women in Statistics
 Carol A. Gotway Crawford, American expert in biostatistics, spatial analysis, environmental statistics, and public health
 Selma Fine Goldsmith (1912–1962), American economic statistician who estimated personal income distribution
 Patricia Grambsch, American biostatistician, expert on proportional hazards models
 Mary W. Gray (born 1938), author in applied statistics and founding president of the Association for Women in Mathematics
 Celia Greenwood, Canadian biostatistician and statistical geneticist
 Cindy Greenwood, Canadian statistician, winner of Krieger–Nelson Prize
 Clare Griffiths, British expert in mortality statistics
 Ulrike Grömping, German expert on regression analysis with variable importance
 Montserrat Guillén (born 1964), Spanish expert in actuarial statistics, fraud detection, and kernel density estimation
 Marcia Gumpertz, American agricultural statistician, uses statistics to study employment of women and minorities in STEM
 Ying Guo, Chinese-American biostatistician and neuroimaging researcher
 Margaret Gurney (1908–2002), American mathematician, survey statistician, and pioneering computer programmer

H
 Margaret Jarman Hagood (1907–1963), president of the Population Association of America
 Marjorie Hahn, American probability theorist and tennis player
 Linda M. Haines, English and South African expert in the design of experiments
 Susan Halabi, American biostatistician known for her research on prostate cancer
 Betz Halloran, biostatistician who studies causal inference and the biostatistics of infectious diseases
 Katherine Halvorsen, American statistician and statistics educator
 Ellen Hamaker (born 1974), Dutch-American psychologist and statistician, analyzes longitudinal data in psychology
 Asta Hampe, German engineer and statistician and first German member of the Women's Engineering Society
 Bronwyn Harch, Australian environmental statistician, applies mathematical sciences to agriculture, environment, health, manufacturing and energy
 Alison Harcourt, Australian mathematician and statistician known for branch and bound algorithms and quantification of poverty in Australia
 Jo Hardin, American statistician who develops high-throughput methods for human genome data
 Rachel M. Harter, American expert on small area estimation and survey methodology
 Dominique Haughton, French-American statistician specializing in business analytics, standards of living, and music analytics
 Lee-Ann C. Hayek, chief mathematical statistician at the National Museum of Natural History
 Martha S. Hearron (1943–2014), American statistician, helped found and later headed the Biopharmaceutical Section of the American Statistical Association
 Nancy E. Heckman, Canadian statistician interested in nonparametric regression, smoothing, functional data analysis, and applications in evolutionary biology
 Inge Henningsen (born 1941), Danish statistician and feminist
 Amy H. Herring, American biostatistician and public health researcher working on methods for correlated data
 Vicki Hertzberg, American biostatistician and public health researcher
 Agnes M. Herzberg, first female president of the Statistical Society of Canada
 Irene Hess, American expert on survey methodology for scientific surveys
 Jennifer Hill, American statistician, applies causal inference to social statistics
 Ho Weang Kee, Malaysian statistical geneticist
 Jennifer A. Hoeting, American statistician known for her work on Bayesian model averaging
 Heike Hofmann (born 1972), researcher on interactive data visualization
 Susan P. Holmes, American statistician who applies nonparametric multivariate statistics, bootstrapping methods, and data visualization to biology
 Virginia Thompson Holran, American expert on the statistics of life insurance
 Susan Horn, American biostatistician, developed models for in-practice use by clinicians
 Carol House, American government statistician specializing in agricultural statistics
 Chao Agnes Hsiung, Taiwanese biostatistician, president of International Chinese Statistical Association
 Joan Hu, Chinese–Canadian statistician, researcher on pseudolikelihood, estimating functions, missing data, and applications
 Rebecca Hubbard, American biostatistician, studies electronic health record data
 Haiyan Huang, Chinese-American biostatistician, expert on human genome and on reproducibility
 Mia Hubert, Belgian robust statistician
 Jacqueline Hughes-Oliver, Jamaican–born American statistician known for her research in drug discovery and chemometrics
 Ying Hung, Taiwanese-American expert in the statistics of computer experiments
 Shelley Hurwitz, American biostatistician and expert in ethics for statisticians
 Marie Hušková (born 1942), Czech mathematician who worked in theoretical statistics and change-point problems
 Jane Hutton, British medical statistician
 Aparna V. Huzurbazar, American statistician who uses graphical models to understand time-to-event data, sister of Snehalata
 Snehalata V. Huzurbazar, American statistician, known for her work in statistical genetics and statistical geology, sister of Aparna
 Shih-Jen Hwang, Taiwanese-American biostatistician and epidemiologist

I
 Lurdes Inoue, Japanese–Brazilian specialist in Bayesian inference
 Telba Irony, Brazilian–American statistician, operations researcher, and proponent of Bayesian statistics at the Food and Drug Administration
 Kathi Irvine, American ecological statistician
 Valerie Isham (born 1947), British applied probabilist, president of Royal Statistical Society
 Julie Ivy, American health care statistician, applies systems engineering to health care and to food bank distribution

J
 Eva E. Jacobs (died 2015), edited Handbook of U.S. Labor Statistics and headed the U.S. Bureau of Labor Statistics Division of Consumer Expenditure Surveys
 Janis Johnston (born 1957), American statistician and sociologist, author of several books on permutation tests in statistics
 Mikyoung Jun, Korean-American spatial and environmental statistician
 Jana Jurečková (born 1940), Czech expert in nonparametric and robust statistics
 Ana Justel, Spanish statistician and Antarctic scientist

K
 Karen Kafadar, American statistician, president of American Statistical Association
 Shirley Kallek (1926–1983), American economic statistician at the Bureau of the Census
 Haya Kaspi (born 1948), Israeli probability theorist
 Tena Katsaounis, Greek-American statistician, president of Caucus for Women in Statistics
 Emilie Kaufmann (born 1987), French statistician and computer scientist, expert on machine learning and multi-armed bandits
 Amarjot Kaur, Indian statistician, president of International Indian Statistical Association
 Katerina Kechris, American biostatistician, uses omics data to study relations between genetics and disease
 Nataša Kejžar, Slovenian Olympic swimmer and network scientist
 Sündüz Keleş, Turkish statistician specializing in statistical methods in genomics
 Sallie Ann Keller (born 1956), American statistician, president of American Statistical Association
 Elizabeth J. Kelly, American statistician, applies statistics to environmental remediation and plutonium disposal
 Gabrielle Kelly, Irish statistician, president of Irish Statistical Association
 Sheryl F. Kelsey (born 1945), first female statistics PhD at Carnegie Mellon University, made significant contributions to heart disease treatment
 Christina Kendziorski, American biostatistician, analyzes high-throughput genetic sequencing data
 Ingrid C. Kildegaard (died 1984), American advertising statistician and market researcher
 Hyune-Ju Kim, Korean-American expert in change-point detection and segmented regression
 Mimi Kim, American statistician in epidemiology, population health, and biostatistics
 Ruth King, British expert on the Bayesian analysis of population size
 Charlotte Kipling (1919–1992), English statistician, ichthyologist, and cryptographer
 Grace E. Kissling, chief statistician for the National Toxicology Program
 Claudia Klüppelberg, German mathematical statistician and applied probability theorist, known for risk assessment and statistical finance
 Inge Koch, Australian statistician, author and advocate for gender diversity in mathematics
 Daphne Koller (born 1968), Israeli–American author of text and online course on probabilistic graphical models, 2004 MacArthur Fellow
 Olga Korosteleva, Russian-American statistician and author of statistics books
 Hildegarde Kneeland (1889–1994), American home economist, social statistician, and expert on time-use research
 Mariana Kotzeva (born 1967), Bulgarian statistician and econometrician, head of National Statistical Institute of Bulgaria and of Eurostat
 Mary Grace Kovar (1926–2015), American biostatistician at the National Center for Health Statistics
 Helena Chmura Kraemer, American biostatistician
 Frauke Kreuter, German researcher on in survey methodology, sampling error, and observational error
 Tatyana Krivobokova, Kazakh statistician, expert on spline smoothing
 Shonda Kuiper, American statistics educator
 Lynn Kuo (born 1949), American statistician known for her work on Bayesian inference in phylogeny
 Bärbel-Maria Kurth (born 1954), German statistician and epidemiologist

L
 Nan Laird (born 1943), American biostatistician, discoverer of the EM algorithm
 Helen Humes Lamale (1912–1998), American labor statistician
 Diane Lambert, American statistician known for zero-inflated models
 Kathleen Lamborn, American biostatistician known for her highly cited publications on glioma
 Mary Beth Landrum, British-American statistician specializing in health services and the quality of health care
 Julia Lane, New Zealand, British, and American economist and economic statistician
 Jodi Lapidus, American biostatistician interested in Native American health and injury prevention
 Lisa Morrissey LaVange, American biostatistician, president of American Statistical Association
 Nicole Lazar (born 1966), American–Canadian–Israeli researcher on empirical likelihood and functional neuroimaging
 Alice Lee (1858–1939), British researcher on biometrics
 Elisa T. Lee, Chinese-American statistician who directs the Center for American Indian Health Research
 Hollylynne Lee, American mathematics and statistics educator
 Ji-Hyun Lee, American expert on clinical trials for cancer, president of Caucus for Women in Statistics
 Mei-Ling Ting Lee, Taiwanese-American biostatistician known for her research on microarrays
 Yoonkyung Lee, Korean–American expert on multicategory support vector machines
 Julie Legler, American biostatistician, statistics educator, and interdisciplinary undergraduate educator
 Virginia Lesser, American researcher on non-sampling error, survey methodology, and agricultural applications of statistics
 Judith T. Lessler, American expert on survey methodology and organic farmer
 Sue Leurgans, American expert on the biostatistics of human body movement
 Elizaveta Levina, Russian–American mathematical statistician known for her work in high-dimensional statistics and covariance estimation
 Denise Lievesley, British director of Statistics at UNESCO, founder of the Institute for Statistics, and director of the UK Data Archive
 Fan Li, Chinese-American biostatistician, applies causal inference to comparative effectiveness
 Mingyao Li, Chinese-American biostatistician and statistical geneticist
 Huazhen Lin, Chinese statistician, expert on survival analysis and nonparametric statistics
 Shili Lin, American statistician who studies applications of statistics to genomic data
 Xihong Lin, Chinese statistician known for contributions to mixed models, non- and semi-parametric regression, and statistical genetics
 Fang Liu, Chinese-American expert on statistical machine learning and data privacy
 Ivy Liu, Taiwanese and New Zealand statistician specializing in categorical and ordinal data
 Regina Liu, American statistician, invented simplicial depth
 Lisa Lix (born 1966), Canadian health scientist and biostatistician
 Greta M. Ljung (born 1941), Finnish–American statistician, namesake of Ljung–Box test for time series data
 Patti Frazer Lock (born 1953), American mathematics and statistics educator and textbook author
 Jane Loevinger (1918–2008), American psychologist and psychometrician, originator of Loevinger's H coefficient
 Regina Loewenstein (1916–1999), American public health statistician
 Sharon Lohr, American statistician, applies survey sampling and design of experiments to education and criminology
 Wendy Lou, Canadian biostatistician, expert on runs and patterns in sequences
 Isobel Loutit (1909–2009), one of the earliest female professional statisticians in Canada

M
 Shujie Ma, Chinese-American expert in nonparametric and semiparametric regression
 Marloes Maathuis (born 1978), Dutch statistician, researcher on causal inference
 Eleanor Josephine Macdonald (1906–2007), American cancer epidemiologist who established the first cancer registry in the US
 Brenda MacGibbon, Canadian mathematician, statistician, and decision scientist
 Helen MacGillivray, Australian statistician, president of International Statistical Institute and Statistical Society of Australia
 Jennifer Madans, American health statistician, acting director of National Center for Health Statistics 
 Amita Manatunga, Sri Lankan biostatistician
 Elizabeth Margosches, American statistician at the US Environmental Protection Agency
 Nancy Mann, American statistician known for her research on quality management, reliability estimation, and the Weibull distribution
 Elizabeth Mannshardt, American environmental statistician, studies climate change and extremes of weather and climate
 Angela Mariotto, Italian statistician, expert on cancer progress measures
 Cathie Marsh (1951–1993), British sociologist and statistician who made a case for the use of surveys in sociology
 Elizabeth A. Martin, American census statististian, introduced cognitive science principles to surveys and improved count of homeless
 Gael M. Martin, Australian Bayesian econometrician
 Margaret P. Martin (1915–2012), American biostatistician, published a series of papers on maternal and infant nutrition
 Wendy L. Martinez, American statistician, author of two books on MATLAB and coordinating editor of Statistics Surveys
 Rochelle Martinez, American government statistician
 Hélène Massam, Canadian statistician known for her research on the Wishart distribution and on graphical models
 Jil Matheson, former National Statistician of the UK
 Nancy Mathiowetz, American sociologist and statistician, combined cognitive psychology with survey methodology
 Deborah Mayo, frequentist statistician and professor of philosophy of science at Virginia Tech; author of books on probability and risk management
 Sally McClean, Northern Irish statistician, computer scientist, and operations researcher
 Leslie McClure, American biostatistician, champion for diversity, and statistics blogger
 Kelly McConville, American statistics educator and survey and environmental statistician
 Laura McKenna, American census statistician, expert on statistical disclosure control
 Fabrizia Mealli (born 1966), Italian researcher on causal inference, missing data, and the statistics of employment
 Elizabeth Meckes, American probability theorist
 Kerrie Mengersen (born 1962), Australian director of the Bayesian Research and Applications Group at Queensland University of Technology
 Margaret Merrell (1900–1995), American biostatistician known for her research on the construction of life tables
 Ida Craven Merriam (1904–1997), American Social Security economist and statistician who founded the National Academy of Social Insurance
 Jacqueline Meulman (born 1954), Dutch expert in multivariate analysis
 Mary C. Meyer, American expert in nonparametric density estimation with shape constraints
 Weiwen Miao, Chinese-American expert on legal statistics
 Ruth Mickey (born 1954), American expert in selection of confounding variables
 Diana Miglioretti, American biostatistician, expert on breast cancer screening and radiation hazards from medical imaging
 Ana Fernández Militino, Spanish spatial statistician
 Antonietta Mira, Italian expert in Markov chain Monte Carlo methods and in mathematical magic
 Carmen A. Miró (1919–2022), Panamanian demographer
 Leyla Mohadjer, expert in survey methodology, total survey error, quality control, and participation bias
 Francesca Molinari, Italian econometrician and economic and survey statistician
 Katherine Monti, American statistician known for graphical methods and the statistics of pet health
 Irene Montie (1921–2018), American statistician for the Census Bureau; president of Caucus for Women in Statistics
 Erica Moodie, Canadian biostatistician, expert on dynamic treatment regimes
 Leslie M. Moore, applies statistics to scientific experiments and simulations
 Motomi Mori, Japanese–American biostatistician who has studied hospital-acquired infections, bone marrow transplants, and personalized medicine
 June Morita, American statistics educator
 Pamela Morse (c. 1923–2009), British and Canadian agricultural statistician
 Alison Motsinger-Reif, American biostatistician and geneticist
 Bhramar Mukherjee, Indian-American biostatistician, chair of COPSS
 Mary Mulry, American census statistician
 Susan Murphy (born 1958), applies statistical methods to clinical trials of treatments for chronic and relapsing medical conditions
 Kary Myers, American expert on scientific data analysis and radiation monitoring
 Janet Myhre, founded Reed Institute for Decision Science at Claremont McKenna College

N

 Mary Gibbons Natrella (1922–1988), author of a widely used handbook on statistics for scientific and engineering experiments
 Johanna G. Nešlehová, Czech-Canadian mathematical statistician, known for work on copulas and operational risk
 Ethel Newbold (1882–1933), English epidemiologist and statistician, namesake of Ethel Newbold Prize for excellence in statistics
 Helen Alma Newton Turner (1908–1995), Australian authority on sheep genetics
 Florence Nightingale (1820–1910), English founder of modern nursing, pioneer in information visualization and statistical graphics
 Deborah A. Nolan, American statistician and statistics educator
 Sharon-Lise Normand, Canadian biostatistician who evaluates the quality of care provided by physicians and hospitals
 Delia North, a leader in statistics education in South Africa
 Janet L. Norwood (1923–2015), first female Commissioner of the U.S. Bureau of Labor Statistics
 Paula Norwood, American biostatistician, worked in pharmaceutical industry
 Sarah Nusser (born 1957), American survey statistician
 Regina Nuzzo, American statistician, science communicator, and teacher of statistics to the deaf
 Vera Nyitrai (1926–2011), president of the Hungarian Central Statistical Office and first female chair of the United Nations Statistical Commission

O
 Nancy Obuchowski (born 1962), American biostatistician and radiologist
 Laura O'Dwyer, Irish-American statistician, performs statistical analyses of science education outcomes
 Judith O'Fallon, American medical statistician
 Sofia Olhede, British mathematical statistician known for her research on wavelets, graphons, and high-dimensional statistics
 Beatrice S. Orleans (died 2011), chief statistician in the US Naval Sea Systems Command
 Mollie Orshansky (1915–2006), American economist and statistician, set poverty thresholds for household income

P
 Susan Paddock, American expert on nonparametric inference for substance abuse and autonomous vehicles
 Edna Paisano (1948–2014), demographer who improved the accuracy of the Native American US census category
 Gladys L. Palmer (1895–1967), American social statistician known for her work on labor mobility and labor statistics
 J. Lynn Palmer, American biostatistician known for her research on missing data and on treatments for cancer
 Mari Palta, Swedish biostatistician, president of the Caucus for Women in Statistics
 Anna Panorska, Polish-American expert on extreme events in stochastic processes and on the effect of weather on baseball performance
 Cristina Parel, first Filipino to earn a doctorate in statistics
 Eun Sug Park, Korean-American transportation statistician
 Jennifer D. Parker, American statistician who studies connections between socioeconomics, pollution, and reproductive health
 Vera Pawlowsky-Glahn, Spanish statistician and geoscientist
 Roxy Peck, American statistics educator
 Magda Peligrad, Romanian probability theorist known for her work on stochastic processes
 Jane Pendergast, American biostatistician specializing in multivariate statistics and longitudinal data
 Olga Pendleton, American expert on road traffic safety and multiple linear regression
 Limin Peng, Chinese biostatistician, won Mortimer Spiegelman Award
 Marianna Pensky, Soviet and American mathematical statistician, expert on wavelets and Bayesian analysis
 Sonia Petrone, Italian statistician who uses Bernstein polynomials in nonparametric Bayesian methods
 Sonja Petrović, American mathematical statistician
 Maxine Pfannkuch, New Zealand statistics educator
 Ruth Pfeiffer, American biostatistician focusing on risk prediction, molecular epidemiology, and electronic medical records
 Polly Phipps, American survey and labor statistician
 Dominique Picard (born 1953), French expert on the statistical applications of wavelets
 Linda Williams Pickle, American expert on spatial data analysis
 E. C. Pielou (1924–2016), Canadian statistical ecologist
 Shirley Pledger, New Zealand mathematician and statistician known for her work on mark and recapture methods
 Elżbieta Pleszczyńska (born 1933), Polish statistician, disability rights activist
 Raquel Prado (born 1970), Venezuelan statistician specializing in Bayesian analysis of time series
 Dionne Price, African-American statistician at the US Food and Drug Administration
 Megan Price, American statistician, uses statistics to investigate human rights violations
 Ruth Rice Puffer (1907–2002), led the Inter-American Investigation of Childhood Mortality at the Pan American Health Organization

Q
 Annie Qu, Chinese statistician known for her work on estimating equations and semiparametric models

R
 Sophia Rabe-Hesketh, American expert on generalized linear mixed models with latent variables
 Kavita Ramanan, Indian–American probability theorist
 Lila Knudsen Randolph (1908–1965), chief statistician at the Food and Drug Administration
 Nalini Ravishanker, Indian statistician interested in time series analysis and applications to actuarial science, business, and transportation
 Bonnie Ray, American statistician and data scientist
 Carol K. Redmond, American biostatistician known for her research on breast cancer
 Nancy Reid (born 1952), Canadian theoretical statistician, president of Institute of Mathematical Statistics and Statistical Society of Canada
 Gesine Reinert, German statistician at Oxford, expert on biological sequences and biological networks
 Jian-Jian Ren, Chinese-American statistician, expert in longitudinal data and survival analysis
 Patricia Reynaud-Bouret (born 1978), French expert on Hawkes processes with applications in neuroscience and genomics
 Gladys H. Reynolds, American statistician who did pioneering research on modeling sexually transmitted diseases
 Dorothy P. Rice (1922–2017), American health statistician who helped create the National Death Index
 Sylvia Richardson, French expert on Bayesian Markov Chain Monte Carlo methods for spatial statistics
 Jeanne Clare Ridley (1925–2007), American sociologist, statistician, and demographer, known for her work on fertility
 Carmen L. Rivera-Medina, Puerto Rican psychologist, statistician, and methodologist
 Naomi B. Robbins, American expert in data visualization
 Paula Roberson, American biostatistician, president of Caucus for Women in Statistics
 Rosemary Roberts, statistics educator who led the creation of AP Statistics
 Eliane R. Rodrigues, Brazilian-Mexican researcher on stochastic models for pollution and health
 Kathryn Roeder, American statistician who laid the foundations for DNA forensics
 Jennifer Rogers, British statistician and statistics communicator
 Judith Rousseau, French statistician who studies frequentist properties of Bayesian methods
 Sherri Rose, American biostatistician, focuses on statistical machine learning for health care policy
 Joan R. Rosenblatt, American statistician, director of computing and applied mathematics at the National Institute of Standards and Technology
 Naomi D. Rothwell, introduced behavioral research to the US Census, wrote about experiences running a halfway house
 Andrea Rotnitzky, Argentine expert on causal inference for medical interventions with missing data
 Gerta Rücker (born 1955), German expert on meta-analysis
 Cynthia Rudin (born 1976), American computer scientist and statistician known for her work in explainable artificial intelligence
 Pat Ruggles, American economist and social statistician who studies poverty
 Deborah J. Rumsey (born 1961), American statistics educator, founder of Consortium for the Advancement of Undergraduate Statistics Education
 Estelle Russek-Cohen, American biostatistician and expert in biometrics
 Barbara Falkenbach Ryan, American mathematician, computer scientist, statistician and business executive
 Louise M. Ryan, Australian expert on the statistics of cancer and risk assessment in environmental health

S
 Chiara Sabatti, Italian-American statistical geneticist
 Mary D. Sammel, American biostatistician also known for her work with guide dogs
 Ester Samuel-Cahn (born 1933), winner of the Israel Prize for her work in statistics
 Lilly Sanathanan, Indian statistician, applied statistics to particle physics and drug development
 Brisa Sánchez, Mexican-American biostatistician and environmental epidemiologist
 Susan M. Sanchez (born 1959), American expert on data farming from agent-based simulation
 Marta Sanz-Solé (born 1952), Catalan researcher on stochastic processes, president of the European Mathematical Society
 Sophie Schbath (born 1969), French statistician of patterns in strings and DNA
 Nora Cate Schaeffer, American sociologist and survey statistician
 Edna Schechtman (born 1948), Israeli expert on mean absolute difference methods, president of Israel Statistical Association
 Alexandra M. Schmidt, Brazilian biostatistician and epidemiologist, president of ISBA
 Elizabeth Scott (1917–1988), applied statistics to astronomy and weather modification, promoted equal opportunity for women
 Marian Scott (born 1956), Scottish statistician specialising in environmental statistics and statistical modelling
 Marilyn Seastrom (born 1951), American educational statistician
 Paola Sebastiani, Italian biostatistician and genetic epidemiologist
 Nell Sedransk, American statistician who directed the National Institute of Statistical Sciences
 Esther Seiden (1908–2014), Polish–Israeli–American mathematical statistician known for her research on design of experiments and combinatorial design
 Kimberly Sellers, American expert on count data, statistical dispersion, and the Conway–Maxwell–Poisson distribution
 Diallo Sène (born 1952), Malian statistician, national minister for the promotion of women, children, and the family
 Damla Şentürk, Turkish-American biostatistician, expert on longitudinal and functional analysis for autism and dialysis
 Juliet Popper Shaffer (born 1932), American psychologist and statistician known for her research on multiple hypothesis testing
 Nagambal Shah, Indian-American mathematician and statistician known for her mentorship of minority students
 Katrina Sharples, New Zealand biostatistician and violist
 Lianne Sheppard, American expert on the health effects of air pollution
 Mindel C. Sheps (1913–1973), Canadian physician, biostatistician and demographer
 Stephanie Shipp, American economist and social statistician
 Galit Shmueli, Israeli expert in business statistics, author of multiple textbooks
 Debra T. Silverman, American biostatistician and cancer epidemiologist
 Eleanor Singer, Austrian-born American expert on survey methodology
 Judith D. Singer, American statistician known for her work on multilevel models, survival analysis, and individual growth models
 Janet Sinsheimer, American statistical geneticist
 Rosedith Sitgreaves (1915–1992), American researcher on random matrices and Kendall's W
 Elizabeth H. Slate, American statistician interested in the Bayesian statistics of longitudinal data and applications to health
 Aleksandra Slavković, American expert on statistical disclosure control, algebraic statistics, and applications in social science
 Margaret Smagorinsky (1915–2011), American government statistician and meteorologist
 Kirstine Smith (1878–1939), Danish statistician, created the field of optimal design of experiments
 Leah M. Smith, Canadian biostatistician and cancer researcher
 Joyce Snell (born 1930), British statistician known for her work on residuals and ordered categorical data, and for her books on statistics
 Rui Song, Chinese-American statistician, expert on causal inference, independence screening, precision medicine, and financial statistics
 Mary Eleanor Spear (1897–1986), American data visualization specialist
 Donna Spiegelman, American biostatistician and epidemiologist
 Nancy Spruill, American statistician and defense acquisitions analyst
 Joan Staniswalis (1957–2018), American biostatistician, studied effects of air quality and racial inequality on health
 Elizabeth Stasny, American expert on missing data in surveys
 Fiona Steele, British statistician who studies longitudinal data and applications in demography and education
 Sandra Stinnett, American statistician specializing in the biostatistics of ophthalmology
 Victoria Stodden, American statistician focusing on the reproducibility of research in computational science
 Maura Stokes, American statistician, SAS developer, and young-adult novelist
 S. Lynne Stokes, American expert on modeling non-sampling errors, mark and recapture methods, and opinion polls
 Ineke Stoop (born 1953), Dutch survey statistician
 Deborah Street (born 1957), Australian expert on the design of experiments
 Cyntha Struthers (born c. 1954), Canadian mathematical statistician, president of Caucus for Women in Statistics
 Elizabeth A. Stuart, American researcher on causal inference and missing data in the statistics of mental health
 Thérèse Stukel, Canadian statistician interested in surgical mortality, regional variations in healthcare spending, and cardiology
 Catherine Sugar, American biostatistician who studies cluster analysis, covariance, and applications in medicine and psychiatry
 Lisa M. Sullivan (born 1961), American biostatistician associated with the Framingham Heart Study
 Jiayang Sun, Chinese-American statistician, president of Caucus for Women in Statistics
 Lei Sun, Chinese-Canadian statistical geneticist
 Nike Sun, American probability theorist studying phase transitions and counting complexity
 Rajeshwari Sundaram, Indian biostatistician, expert in survival analysis and reproductive health
 Deborah F. Swayne, American expert on information visualization who wrote the GGobi software package

T
 Irene Barnes Taeuber (1906–1974), American editor of Population Index who helped establish the science of demography
 Judith Tanur, American editor of the International Encyclopedia of Social Sciences
 Mahbanoo Tata (born 1942), Indian-born Iranian statistician
 Nancy Temkin, American statistician who works on the biostatistics of traumatic brain injury
 Dorothy Swaine Thomas (1899–1977), population growth expert who became first female president of the American Sociological Association
 Lori Thombs, American social statistician, president of Southern Regional Council On Statistics
 C. Jean Thompson (born 1940), president of New Zealand Statistical Association
 Elizabeth A. Thompson (born 1949), English-born American statistician, uses genetic data to infer relationships between individuals and populations
 Jean Helen Thompson (1926–1992), British chief statistician in Office of Population Censuses and Surveys, president of British Society for Population Studies
 Katherine J. Thompson, American statistician in the Census Bureau, president of ASA Section on Government Statistics
 Mary E. Thompson, Canadian statistician known for her work in  tobacco control, and president of the Statistical Society of Canada
 Ene-Margit Tiit (born 1934), Estonian mathematician and statistician, founding president of Estonian Statistical Society
 Barbara Tilley, American biostatistician, president of Caucus for Women in Statistics
 Kate Tilling, British statistician interested in applications to epidemiology and health services
 Mary N. Torrey (born 1910), American mathematical statistician and expert in quality control
 Sherry Towers, American and Canadian statistician, studied contagion effect of mass shootings

U
 María Dolores Ugarte, Spanish spatial statistician and epidemiologist
 Caroline Uhler (1935– ), Swiss statistician specializing in algebraic statistics and its applications in genomics
 Theresa Utlaut, American statistical quality control engineer at Intel
 Jessica Utts (born 1952), American parapsychologist, statistics educator, and president of the American Statistical Association

V
 Angelika van der Linde, German expert on Bayesian model complexity
 Ingrid Van Keilegom (born 1971), Belgian statistician interested in nonparametric statistics and survival analysis
 Mary van Kleeck (1883–1972), American social feminist and proponent of scientific management and a planned economy
 Marina Vannucci (born 1966), Italian expert in wavelets, feature selection, and cluster analysis in Bayesian statistics
 Maria Eulália Vares, Brazilian expert in stochastic processes
 Eva Vedel Jensen (born 1951), Danish spatial statistician, stereologist, and stochastic geometer
 Maria-Pia Victoria-Feser, Swiss statistician, applies robust statistics to statistical finance and biostatistics
 Olga Vitek, biostatistician and computer scientist specializing in bioinformatics and proteomics
 Júlia Volaufová, Slovak biostatistician, studies nutrition and mixed models

W
 Jane Wadsworth (1942–1997), British medical statistician and sexual health researcher
 Grace Wahba (born 1934), American pioneer in methods for smoothing noisy data
 Helen M. Walker (1891–1983), first female president of the American Statistical Association
 Melanie Wall (born 1971), American psychiatric biostatistician, psychometrician, and mental health data scientist
 Katherine Wallman, Chief Statistician of the United States and president of the American Statistical Association
 Huixia Judy Wang, Chinese–American expert on quantile regression
 Jane-Ling Wang, studies dimension reduction, functional data analysis, and aging
 Lily Wang, Chinese-American statistician, studies non- and semi-parametric methods for large high-dimensional data sets
 Mei-Cheng Wang, Taiwanese biostatistician known for her work on survival analysis and truncation
 Naisyin Wang, Taiwanese statistician, president of the International Chinese Statistical Association
 Sue-Jane Wang, biostatistician in the US Food and Drug Administration
 Marie Wann, American government statistician, president of Caucus for Women in Statistics
 Ann E. Watkins, American statistics educator, president of the Mathematical Association of America
 Kimberly Weems, American statistician active in mentoring women and members of underrepresented groups
 Ying Wei, Chinese statistician interested in quantile regression and semiparametric models of longitudinal data
 Clarice Weinberg, American environmental biostatistician and epidemiologist
 Joanne Wendelberger, American statistician and a scientist at the Los Alamos National Laboratory
 Nanny Wermuth (born 1943), German and Swedish expert in graphical Markov models and their applications in the life sciences
 Jessamine S. Whitney (1880–1941), American statistician and public health professional
 Alice S. Whittemore, American group theorist, biostatistician, and epidemiologist who studies the effects of genetics and lifestyle on cancer
 Aryness Joy Wickens (1901–1991), American labor statistician and president of the American Statistical Association
 Rebecca Willett, American statistician and computer scientist working in machine learning, signal processing, and data science
 Ruth J. Williams, American probability theorist, president of Institute of Mathematical Statistics, member of National Academy of Sciences
 Alyson Wilson (born 1967), American expert on Bayesian reliability and military statistics
 Susan R. Wilson (born 1948), Australian statistician known for studying biostatistics, statistical genetics, and the spread of AIDS in Australia
 Sharon Witherspoon (born 1956), British Head of Policy of the Academy of Social Sciences, founding researcher of British Social Attitudes Survey
 Daniela Witten, American biostatistician interested in machine learning and high-dimensional data
 Janet Wittes, American statistician and statistical consultant specializing in clinical trials
 Frances Wood (1883–1919), English medical statistician, namesake of Wood medal of Royal Statistical Society
 Hilda Mary Woods (1892–1971), British epidemiologist, first female lecturer at the London School of Hygiene and Tropical Medicine
 Jane Worcester (died 1989), American biostatistician and epidemiologist, second tenured woman at the Harvard School of Public Health
 Margaret Wu, Australian statistician, developed estimators for genetic diversity
 Margaret C. Wu, American biostatistician, expert on censored data

Y
 Grace Yang, Chinese–American expert on stochastic processes in the physical sciences, asymptotic theory, and survival analysis
 Jean Yang, Australian statistician known for her work on microarray and mass spectrometry data
 Grace Y. Yi, Chinese–Canadian expert in event history analysis with missing data in medicine, engineering, and social science
 Linda J. Young (born 1952), Chief Mathematical Statistician at the National Agricultural Statistics Service
 Cleo Youtz (1909–2005), long-time research assistant of Frederick Mosteller
 Ruriko Yoshida, Japanese-American combinatorist, statistician, phylogeneticist, and operations researcher
 Bin Yu, Chinese–American statistician, president of the Institute of Mathematical Statistics

Z
 Ann Zauber, American biostatistician whose research demonstrated the effectiveness of colonoscopy
 Judy Zeh, American statistician known for Bayesian estimation of bowhead whale populations
 Rita Zemach (1926–2015), American statistician who worked for the Michigan Department of Public Health
 Hao Helen Zhang, Chinese–American expert in nonparametric statistics, data mining, and machine learning
 Hongmei Zhang, Chinese-American biostatistician, expert in epigenetics
 Lan Zhang, Chinese-American financial econometrician
 Linda Zhao, Chinese-American statistician, applies machine learning to real estate pricing
 Tian Zheng, Chinese-American applied statistician, studies complex data for social networks, bioinformatics, and geoscience
 Jun Zhu, American statistician and entomologist interested in spatio-temporal data and environmental statistics
 Rebecca Zwick, American expert on educational assessment and college admissions

See also
Caucus for Women in Statistics
List of female scientists
List of women in mathematics

References

 
Lists of women by occupation